The yellow-breasted warbling antbird (Hypocnemis subflava) is a species of bird in the family Thamnophilidae. Until recently, it was considered a subspecies of Hypocnemis cantator, but based on vocal differences and to a lesser degree differences in plumages it has been recommended treating them as separate species. As presently defined, the yellow-breasted warbling antbird includes a single subspecies, collinsi.

The yellow-breasted warbling antbird was described by the German ornithologist Jean Cabanis in 1873 and given its current binomial name Hypocnemis subflava.

The yellow-breasted warbling antbird is found at lower levels in humid forest, especially in association with bamboo, in south-eastern Peru, northern Bolivia and south-western Brazil (Acre). It is locally sympatric with the Peruvian warbling antbird. Its conservation status has not been assessed by BirdLife International, but as it generally is fairly common, it is unlikely to be threatened.

References

 Isler, Isler, & Whitney. 2007. Species limits in antbirds (Thamnophilidae): The Warbling Antbird (Hypocnemis cantator) complex. The Auk. 124(1): 11–28.
 Zimmer & Isler. 2003. Hypocnemis cantator (Warbling Antbird). Pp. 645 in del Hoyo, Elliott, & Christie. 2003. Handbook of the Birds of the World. Vol. 8. Broadbills to Tapaculos. Lynx Edicions. Barcelona.
 Split Hypocnemis cantator by elevating H. flavescens, peruviana, subflava, ochrogyna and striata to species rank. South American Classification Committee. Accessed 2008-06-27

yellow-breasted warbling antbird
Birds of the Peruvian Amazon
Birds of the Bolivian Amazon
yellow-breasted warbling antbird